Pingasa floridivenis is a moth of the family Geometridae first described by Louis Beethoven Prout in 1920. It is found in Ghana.

References

Pseudoterpnini
Moths described in 1920
Taxa named by Louis Beethoven Prout